Sperm is the male reproductive cell, or gamete, in anisogamous forms of sexual reproduction.

Sperm may also refer to:

Reproduction 
Spermatozoon (zoosperm), a sperm cell propelled by a single flagellum, found in most animals
Semen ("sperma"), the bodily fluid containing spermatozoa

Related uses
Sperm bank
Sperm competition
Sperm donation
Sperm granuloma
Sperm guidance
Sperm heteromorphism
Sperm motility
Sperm precedence
Sperm sorting
Sperm theft
Sperm washing

Other uses
Catch the Sperm, computer game
The Sperm, a 2007 Thai film
Sperm, a 1994 album by Oomph!
Sperm Bluff, Victoria Land, Antarctica
Sperm whale, a large toothed whale
Sperm oil, substance obtained from sperm whales
Sperm Wars, book by Robin Baker

See also
Spèrme, a 2016 book by Michel Polnareff